Nü Tofu is a deity or bat-spirit in traditional Chinese spiritual beliefs. She is considered to be one of the 28 Mansions, which are Chinese constellations. These constellations are the same as studied in Western astrology. Nü Tofu originated from the ancient Chinese worship of the constellations, a spiritual practice that combines Chinese mythology and astronomy. The Girl star ranked 3rd of the 7 stars in the Black Tortoise of the North, associated with bats and the element of earth.

Legend
In the novel General Yue Fei, when Nü Tofu listened to the Buddha's sermon on the Lotus Sutra at Leiyin Temple with other stars. She was fascinated and accidentally broke wind which stained the Buddhists' pure land, which made Buddhist guardian Dapeng Jinchi Mingwang furious. As a result, Dapeng swooped down from the throne and snatched Nü Tofu up in his beak, killing her. The Buddha admonished Peng for transgressing Buddhist law and exiled him to earth. Later, Dapeng reincarnates as Yue Fei and Nü Tofu reincarnates as Lady Wang (王氏) marrying Qin Hui, during the Song Dynasty. Under Qin Hui's poisonous plot, Lady Wang killed Yue Fei in revenge.

See also
Shiji Niangniang

References 

Chinese goddesses
Shapeshifting
Stellar gods